You're Not So Tough is a 1940 Universal Studios drama film directed by Joe May and starring Dead End Kids and the Little Tough Guys and was the first in the series where Billy Halop and Huntz Hall weren't billed in the opening credits before the Dead End Kids name.

Plot
The Dead End Kids ride a freight train through California. After the kids get arrested for vagrancy, members Tom and Pig are hired to work on a ranch owned by kindly Mama Posito. Tom learns that Posito hasn't seen her son in years, but believes that he may still be alive. In an attempt to steal her money, Tom decides to pose as her son. However, Posito's  soon gets the best of Tom, and he decides to stay with her for love, rather than for greed.

Cast

The Dead End Kids
 Billy Halop - Tommy Abraham Lincoln
 Huntz Hall - Albert 'Pig'
 Gabriel Dell - String
 Bernard Punsly - Ape
 Bobby Jordan - Rap

The Little Tough Guys
 Hally Chester - Second Newsboy
 Harris Berger - Jake, a Worker
 David Gorcey - First Worker

Additional cast
 Nan Grey - Millie
 Henry Armetta - Salvatore
 Rosina Galli- Mama (Lisa) Posita
 Joe King - Collins
 Arthur Loft - Marshall
 Harry Hayden - Lacey
 Eddy Waller - Les Griswold

Production
Billy Halop and Huntz Hall were now joined by fellow Dead End Kids Gabriel Dell, Bernard Punsly, and Bobby Jordan, the latter making his first of three appearances in the Universal series.

The series was now officially coined "The Dead End Kids and The Little Tough Guys". However, much of the attention for most of these entries would be on the original Dead End Kids, while the Little Tough Guys were often reduced to walk-on cameos.

References

External links
 

1940 films
1940s English-language films
American black-and-white films
American drama films
1940 drama films
Films scored by Hans J. Salter
Universal Pictures films
1940s American films